The 2021 season of Papua New Guinea National Rugby League competition will be the 31st season of the premier rugby league competition in Papua New Guinea since 1991.

Teams 

The competition will still have 12 franchise teams competing in 2021.

Ladder 

 The team highlighted in blue has clinched the minor premiership
 Teams highlighted in green have qualified for the finals
 The team highlighted in red has clinched the wooden spoon

References

2021 in Papua New Guinea rugby league
2021 in Papua New Guinean sport
2021 in rugby league